Scottish Civil War can refer to a number of internecine wars in Scottish history, including:

 War of the Scottish succession, 1094–1097
 The revolts of the Meic Uilleim in the late 12th Century and early 13th Century
 The revolts of the Macheths in the late 12th Century and early 13th Century
 Wars of Scottish Independence
 Marian civil war between Mary, Queen of Scots, and Regent Moray, 1568–1573
 Scotland in the Wars of the Three Kingdoms, 1639-1651
 The Jacobite risings, 1688–1746